Aorangi Forest Park is a  protected area in the Wellington Region of New Zealand administered by the Department of Conservation (DOC). It had been called the Haurangi Forest Park but DOC changed to reflect the Māori name of the range protected by the park.

The park has six backcountry huts and a recreational hunting area in the park. There is a large herd of wild red deer and dry conditions, making the park a popular destination for deerstalkers. There is also a small number of goats and pigs in the park.  

The park can be accessed by foot from several local roads, or via private land with the permission of landowners.

History

A sole-charger presided over the park for several decades, serving as "part caretaker, part sheriff" and de facto police, fire service and fisheries officer.

A rare native long-tailed bat was detected in the forest park in March 2020.

A 17-year-old hunter was rescued from the park in July 2020 after falling down a cliff.

In 2021, James Cameron and his wife committed part of their farmland to establishing a functioning native forest from the Aorangi Forest Park to the foothills of the Remutaka Ranges.

Two families became stranded in the park overnight in June 2021 after their four-wheel drive became stuck.

See also
Forest Parks of New Zealand
Protected areas of New Zealand
Conservation in New Zealand
Tramping in New Zealand

References

External links

Aorangi Forest Park at the Department of Conservation
Aorangi Forest Park at Google Maps

South Wairarapa District
Forest parks of New Zealand
Protected areas of the Wellington Region
1978 establishments in New Zealand
Protected areas established in 1978